Girl in Love is an album by saxophonist Bud Shank recorded in 1966 for the World Pacific label.

Reception

AllMusic rated the album with 2 stars.

Track listing
 "Lady Jane" (Mick Jagger, Keith Richards) - 3:05
 "Summer Wind" (Heinz Meier, Hans Bradtke, Johnny Mercer) - 2:25
 "The Sun Ain't Gonna Shine (Anymore)" (Bob Crewe, Bob Gaudio) - 2:29
 "Strangers in the Night" (Bert Kaempfert, Charles Singleton, Eddie Snyder) - 2:40
 "When a Man Loves a Woman" (Andrew Wright, Calvin Lewis) - 2:23
 "Girl in Love" (Chet Kelley, Tom King) - 2:35
 "Don't Go Breaking My Heart" (Burt Bacharach, Hal David) - 2:35
 "Everybody Loves Somebody Sometime" (Irving Taylor, Ken Lane) - 2:40
 "Time" (Michael Merchant) - 3:16
 "The Shining Sea" (Johnny Mandel, Peggy Lee) - 2:38
 "Lara's Theme" (Maurice Jarre) - 2:08
 "Solitary Man" (Neil Diamond) - 2:58

Personnel 
Bud Shank - alto saxophone
Frank Rosolino - trombone
Bob Florence - piano
Dennis Budimir, Herb Ellis, John Pisano - guitar
Bob West - bass
Frank Capp - drums
Victor Feldman - percussion
Unidentified string section arranged and conducted by Oliver Nelson

References 

1966 albums
World Pacific Records albums
Bud Shank albums
Albums arranged by Oliver Nelson
Albums conducted by Oliver Nelson